The Second Battle of Stamford occurred when King Edward assaulted Stamford in late May 918. It soon fell to his army of Wessex. Later that year, Edward built a second burh on the south side of the River Welland. The ramparts of the northern burh may have been approximately 3100 ft (c. 750 hides) from Roffe, and the Edwardian burh around 2700 ft (c. 650 hides).

See also
Battle of Stamford (894)

References

910s conflicts
Battles involving Wessex
Battles involving the Vikings
Battles involving the Anglo-Saxons